Přeborov is a municipality and village in Písek District in the South Bohemian Region of the Czech Republic. It has about 100 inhabitants.

Geography
It lies in the Vlašim Uplands.

History
The first written mention of Přeborov is from 1488.

Gallery

References

Villages in Písek District